Interstate 287 (I-287) is an auxiliary Interstate Highway in the US states of New Jersey and New York. It is a partial beltway around New York City, serving the northern half of New Jersey and the counties of Rockland and Westchester in New York. Through New Jersey, I-287 runs west from its southern terminus in Edison through suburban areas. In Bridgewater Township, the freeway takes a more northeasterly course, paralleled by US Route 202 (US 202). The northernmost part of I-287 in New Jersey passes through mountainous surroundings. After crossing into New York at Suffern, I-287 turns east on the New York State Thruway (I-87) and runs through Rockland County. After crossing the Hudson River on the Tappan Zee Bridge, I-287 splits from I-87 near Tarrytown and continues east through Westchester County on the Cross-Westchester Expressway until it reaches the New England Thruway. Within New Jersey, I-287 is maintained by the New Jersey Department of Transportation (NJDOT), and, within New York, it is maintained by the New York State Thruway Authority (NYSTA).

A bypass around New York City had been planned since the 1950s and would become a part of the Interstate Highway System and receive the I-287 designation. The Cross-Westchester Expressway, which was originally designated as Interstate 187 (I-187), opened in 1960 as Interstate 487 (I-487) before later becoming part of I-287. The New York State Thruway portion of I-287, which included a crossing of the Hudson River, opened in 1955. In New Jersey, the proposed I-287 had originally been designated as FAI Corridor 104 and incorporated what was planned as the Middlesex Freeway. The New Jersey section of I-287 between the New Jersey Turnpike in Edison and US 202 in Montville opened in stages between the 1960s and 1973; the remainder was completed by 1994. The aging Tappan Zee Bridge was replaced with a new span which opened in stages between 2017 and 2018.

A proposed tunnel across the Long Island Sound between Rye and Oyster Bay on Long Island would link the eastern terminus of I-287 to New York State Route 25 (NY 25) and NY 135 in Syosset.

Route description

|-
|NJ
|
|-
|NY
|
|-
|Total
|
|}

New Jersey

Middlesex County

I-287 begins at an interchange with the New Jersey Turnpike (I-95) in Edison in Middlesex County, New Jersey, where the freeway continues east as Route 440 toward Perth Amboy and Staten Island. Within Middlesex County, I-287 is called the Lt. Col. (Ret) Richard F. Lauer, US Army Highway. From this point, it heads west as an eight-lane freeway through suburban areas, soon reaching an interchange with US 1 that also has access to County Route 531 (CR 531) in the southbound direction. Past this point, the road turns more to the northwest and passes under Conrail Shared Assets Operations's Bonhamtown Industrial Track line and a railroad spur before it comes to the junction with Route 27 (Lincoln Highway). Following Route 27, I-287 narrows to six lanes and passes over Amtrak's Northeast Corridor as it continues to a southbound exit and northbound entrance with CR 501.

As the freeway continues into South Plainfield, it passes near several business parks and comes to a partial interchange with Durham Avenue which only has a northbound exit and southbound entrance. At this point, the road starts to turn more west before it comes to a full junction with CR 529. Here, the road enters Piscataway and reaches an interchange with CR 665 (Washington Avenue). Continuing near more business parks, I-287 comes to the exit for South Randolphville Road. Following this interchange, the road heads west more before it turns to the southwest and comes to an interchange with the northern terminus of Route 18. After Route 18, the freeway comes to the CR 622 (River Road) exit.

Somerset County

After crossing over the Raritan River, I-287 enters Franklin Township, Somerset County, and becomes the Captain (Ret) Joseph Azzolina, US Navy Highway. Soon after the river, there is an interchange with CR 527. After CR 527, the freeway makes a turn to the northwest and passes a mix of residential areas and business parks. The road has an interchange with CR 623 (Weston Canal Road) before crossing the Raritan River again and continuing into Bridgewater Township. Within Bridgewater Township, I-287 curves north-northwest and passes over Conrail Shared Assets Operations's Lehigh Line and then both NJ Transit's Raritan Valley Line and CR 533 near TD Bank Ballpark, which is home to the Somerset Patriots baseball team. Past this area, the road encounters Route 28 at an interchange. Past Route 28, the freeway turns northwest and passes over Norfolk Southern Railway's Middle Brook Industrial Track line before it intersects US 22 at a partial interchange with a northbound exit and entrance and southbound entrance. From this point, I-287 makes a turn to the west and runs to the north of US 22 as it has a wide median. The freeway turns northwest as it passes near the Bridgewater Commons shopping mall and reaches a partial interchange with US 202/US 206. Through the remainder of New Jersey, US 202 parallels the course of I-287. At this point, I-287 gains a local–express lane configuration, with three local and two express lanes southbound and three express and three local lanes northbound. Both the southbound local and express lanes have access to southbound US 202/US 206 at this interchange, whereas northbound US 202/US 206 only has access to the local lanes of northbound I-287.

From here, the road continues north past suburban residential areas, with the northbound direction narrowing to two local lanes, before entering Bedminster. Here, I-287 intersects I-78 at the Vincent R. Kramer Interchange, where the local–express lane configuration ends. Access from eastbound I-78 to southbound I-287 is only to the local lanes. Meanwhile, the express lanes of northbound I-287 provides access to westbound I-78 while the local lanes provide access to eastbound I-78. Following I-78, I-287 heads north with four northbound lanes and three southbound lanes into more wooded surroundings, reaching another interchange with US 202/US 206. At this point, the freeway median widens again as it turns northeast before continuing more to the east and entering Far Hills. Within Far Hills, the road passes under CR 512 before the northbound direction narrows to three lanes and the wide median ends. Entering Bernards Township, I-287 runs east-northeast to an interchange with CR 525. After the CR 525 interchange, the road gains a wide median that narrows again before the road runs under NJ Transit's Gladstone Branch, heading more to the northeast. Before leaving Bernards Township, there is an exit for North Maple Avenue.

Morris County

A short distance after this interchange, I-287 enters Harding Township, Morris County, at the crossing of the Passaic River, where it becomes the Marine Hector Cafferata Jr. Cong. Medal of Honor Highway. It continues northeast, with US 202 running a short distance to the west. The freeway makes a turn more to the east as it comes to a truck-only rest area in the northbound direction. The road crosses into Morris Township, where it reaches an exit-only interchange with Harter Road; there are no entrances present.  Shortly after Harter Road, there is a junction with CR 663 (James Street) that only has entrances to I-287. After this, I-287 turns north and enters Morristown, where the southbound direction gains a fourth lane as the median narrows. The freeway enters more developed areas as it comes to the Route 124 interchange. From this point, the road becomes eight lanes total, with four in each direction, as it passes west of Morristown Medical Center. After crossing under NJ Transit's Morristown Line, it reaches the exit for CR 510. From CR 510, I-287 makes a turn to the northeast, crossing back into Morris Township before continuing into Hanover Township. Here, the route comes to the western terminus of the Route 24 freeway and becomes ten lanes total. Following Route 24, the freeway passes over the Morristown and Erie Railway's Whippany Line before it intersects Route 10 and becomes nine lanes, with five southbound and four northbound. I-287 passes near several business parks as it enters Parsippany–Troy Hills. In this area, there is an interchange with CR 511 east of Lake Parsippany that also has access to Entin Road in the southbound direction. After this, I-287 widens to eleven lanes with five northbound lanes, two express southbound lanes, and four local southbound lanes as it comes to the I-80 junction.

Following this interchange, the freeway becomes six lanes, with three in each direction as it continues into more wooded areas and reaching an exit with access to US 46 and US 202/CR 511. In this area, the highway runs to the west of the Boonton Reservoir and immediately to the east of US 202/CR 511. I-287 comes to the Intervale Road exit, which carries US 202 and CR 511. The freeway enters Boonton, where it turns northeast, with NJ Transit's Montclair-Boonton Line located a short distance to the northwest. In Boonton, there is another interchange with US 202/CR 511. From here, I-287 curves more to the east, with US 202 running immediately to the north of the road. Along this stretch, there is an exit for US 202 and Vreeland Avenue. Upon entering Montville, the passes near wooded residential areas before coming to another interchange with US 202. I-287 continues northeast from this point, drawing away from US 202, crossing under NJ Transit's Montclair-Boonton Line before running north-northeast through more woodland as the terrain starts to get more mountainous. This stretch of I-287 continues for  before its next exit. The freeway runs through Kinnelon, where the northbound direction has four lanes, and Pequannock Township before entering Riverdale. In Riverdale, there is an interchange with Route 23. A short distance later, I-287 reaches the CR 694 interchange which provides access to CR 511 Alternate (CR 511 Alt.).

Passaic and Bergen counties

Immediately after this, I-287 crosses over the Pequannock River and New York, Susquehanna and Western Railway's New Jersey Subdivision line into Bloomingdale, Passaic County, where the highway becomes US Air Force Gunner Clarence "Red" Mosley Highway. The road continues northeast and turns north as it briefly passes through Pompton Lakes before crossing into Wanaque. Here, the road makes a turn northeast again as it comes to the CR 511 Alternate interchange. After this, I-287 passes through rock cuts in the Ramapo Mountains before making a sharp turn east as it crosses high above the Wanaque River valley on a bridge. The freeway continues into Oakland, Bergen County, where the name becomes Army Staff Sergeant Walter Bray Highway.

Here, there are a couple of businesses near the road before the interchange with Skyline Drive. Following this, the road crosses the Ramapo River before passing near neighborhoods and reaching a junction with US 202. After US 202, I-287 turns southeast and closely parallels the New York, Susquehanna and Western Railway line to the southwest before entering Franklin Lakes and coming to an interchange with the northern terminus of Route 208. Past this interchange, I-287 narrows to four lanes and turns northeast as the railroad line draws away. The freeway passes wooded residential neighborhoods prior to turning north and entering Mahwah, where it continues near more wooded suburban areas as well as the Campgaw Mountain Reservation to the west of the road. After passing to the east of the Ramapo College campus, I-287 passes over US 202. The freeway crosses the Ramapo River again before reaching an interchange with Route 17. At this point, Route 17 forms a concurrency with I-287 and the road widens to six lanes as it passes between the Ramapo Valley County Reservation to the west and business parks to the east.

New York

New York State Thruway

Upon entering New York in the village of Hillburn in the town of Ramapo in Rockland County, New York, New Jersey's Route 17 ends and NY 17 follows I-287 as the road comes to an interchange with the New York State Thruway (I-87). At this point, I-287 joins I-87 on the eight-lane New York State Thruway, passing over Metro-North Railroad's Port Jervis Line as it heads east out of the mountains into suburban residential and commercial surroundings as it narrows to six lanes. After passing through the village of Montebello, the freeway reaches an interchange with Airmont Road where it becomes the border between Montebello to the north and the village of Airmont to the south. Continuing to the east, the New York State Thruway becomes the border between Monsey and Airmont before separating Monsey from the village of Chestnut Ridge to the south as it turns slightly to the east-southeast. After briefly running along the south edge of the village of Spring Valley, where there is a westbound toll gantry for trucks, the highway fully enters Chestnut Ridge. In this area, it comes to the Thruway's Garden State Parkway Connector. Following this junction, I-87/I-287 continues east into the town of Clarkstown, coming to an exit for NY 59. After this, the road passes to the north of Nanuet, crossing under NJ Transit/Metro-North Railroad's Pascack Valley Line. The freeway crosses under NY 304 before the cloverleaf interchange with the Palisades Interstate Parkway. As the Thruway continues into West Nyack, it passes under CSX Transportation's River Subdivision line before coming to the exit for NY 303 that provides access to the Palisades Center shopping mall to the south of the road.

Past NY 303, I-87/I-287 turns to the east-southeast and passes near wooded areas as well as suburban neighborhoods of Central Nyack. It comes to another interchange with NY 59 that also provides access to US 9W. Within this interchange, the roadway has an eastbound toll gantry for the Tappan Zee Bridge that allows tolls to be collected at highway speeds using E-ZPass or toll by mail. At this point, the New York State Thruway widens to eight lanes and turns to the south-southeast into the village of Nyack in the town of Orangetown, crossing over US 9W prior to passing near residential areas in the village of South Nyack as it runs to the east of US 9W, descending into the Palisades. The last interchange in Rockland County is with US 9W and has no southbound exit. From here, the New York State Thruway crosses the Hudson River on the Tappan Zee Bridge east into the village of Tarrytown in the town of Greenburgh in Westchester County. After passing over the river, the road crosses over Metro-North Railroad's Hudson Line. After this, the freeway comes to the exit for US 9 that also serves the western terminus of NY 119. I-87/I-287 continues east past woodland and business parks, leaving Tarrytown. The two routes then split; I-87 continues south on the New York State Thruway, while I-287 heads east on the Cross-Westchester Expressway. This interchange also has access to and from the northbound Saw Mill River Parkway and NY 119.

Cross-Westchester Expressway

The Cross-Westchester Expressway, which is maintained by the NYSTA, is six lanes wide and carries I-287 east to a westbound exit for NY 119 that is intertwined with the ramps between the New York State Thruway and NY 119/Saw Mill River Parkway. After passing over the Saw Mill River Parkway and the Saw Mill River, the road enters the village of Elmsford and runs through developed areas as it has a partial diamond interchange with NY 9A that does not have an eastbound exit. The Cross-Westchester Expressway turns southeast from this point and intersects the Sprain Brook Parkway. I-287 widens to eight lanes at this junction and continues to the exit for NY 100A. After the NY 100A interchange, the freeway leaves Elmsford and turns to the east near residential areas, narrowing to six lanes before coming to an exit for NY 100 and NY 119 that also has access to the Bronx River Parkway.

Following this exit, the road becomes eight lanes again and crosses over the Bronx River Parkway, the Bronx River, and Metro-North Railroad's Harlem Line. Here, the road crosses into White Plains and reaches an interchange with NY 22. Past NY 22, I-287 makes a sharp curve to the south as it narrows to six lanes and runs near inhabited neighborhoods. The road has a westbound exit and eastbound entrance with the Central Westchester Parkway, a road that provides access to the Taconic State Parkway by way of NY 22. The freeway runs past commercial areas to the east of downtown White Plains as it encounters Westchester Avenue, which connects to NY 119, NY 127, and Anderson Hill Road as well as The Westchester shopping mall in the downtown area. Within this interchange, the Cross-Westchester Expressway turns east along the border between Harrison to the north and White Plains to the south. Westchester Avenue becomes a frontage road for I-287 as the road passes corporate parks to the north and populated neighborhoods to the south.

The road begins to turn southeast as it comes to a directional interchange with the southern terminus of I-684. The I-287 freeway heads south along the White Plains–Harrison border before turning east and fully entering Harrison, where there is a cloverleaf interchange with the Hutchinson River Parkway. At this interchange, the Westchester Avenue frontage road serves as a collector–distributor road. The Cross-Westchester Expressway turns southeast again past wooded areas of development, with NY 120 coming onto the Westchester Avenue frontage road. I-287 reaches an interchange where the frontage road ends as Westchester Avenue heads east as NY 120A and NY 120 continues to the south. Here, the freeway enters the village of Rye Brook in the town of Rye as it continues southeast. The Cross-Westchester Expressway comes into the village of Port Chester, where the road runs near more dense suburban development as it intersects US 1. At this point, the road has ramp access to and from the southbound direction of the New England Thruway (I-95). From here, the mainline I-287 narrows to four lanes and enters the city of Rye, where it passes over the Northeast Corridor before merging into northbound I-95 about a half-mile west of the Connecticut state line.

History

New Jersey

In the 1950s, a limited-access highway was proposed to bypass New York City. This planned beltway would be incorporated into the new Interstate Highway System. The proposed beltway in New Jersey was designated as FAI Corridor 104 and later received the I-287 designation in 1958. The southern segment of I-287 was planned in the 1950s as the Middlesex Freeway, which was to run from the Outerbridge Crossing to Staten Island and follow the Route 440 corridor to Edison, where it would connect to the New Jersey Turnpike before continuing west to I-78. From here, the freeway would parallel US 202 north to the New York border. The anticipated cost of building I-287 in New Jersey was $235 million (equivalent to $ in ). The southernmost part of I-287 in Middlesex County was intended to be signed as part of I-95 instead; this never happened due to the cancellation of the Somerset Freeway. By the mid-1960s, I-287 had been completed between the New Jersey Turnpike and Bedminster and from US 46 in Parsippany to US 202 in Montville. More of I-287 in New Jersey had been finished by 1969, with the sections from US 46 south to Route 10 in Hanover Township and from Bedminster north to Maple Avenue in Bernards Township opened. The segment of the highway between Maple Avenue and Route 24 opened in 1973, followed by the segment between Route 24 and Route 10 in early 1975, making I-287 a continuous road between the New Jersey Turnpike in Edison and US 202 in Montville.

I-287's missing section between US 202 in Montville and the New York State Thruway in Suffern, New York, was controversial dating back to 1965 and continuing until its opening in 1993. Property owners along the proposed route fought its completion as part of the freeway revolts of the 1960s and 1970s. Originally, I-287 was proposed to take a more eastern route through the Lincoln Park and Wayne areas; this routing gained opposition as it passed through populated areas. A more western alignment was planned through mountainous areas in 1973, but this was rejected as the cost of building the road through the mountains was too high. In 1977, the current alignment of I-287 was proposed between Montville and Suffern; this was approved by the federal government in 1982 as it was less costly than the western alignment and went through less developed areas than the eastern alignment.

Permits allowing construction to begin on this segment were issued in 1988 by the US Army Corps of Engineers. Officials in Rockland County, New York filed a lawsuit on November 19, 1993, hours before the highway's official ribbon-cutting, seeking to block its opening. They claimed the incomplete interchange with the New York State Thruway was inadequate to handle the additional traffic. That interchange was not complete until 1994, but the highway opened as planned on November 19 in a ceremony held on the Wanaque River bridge, where New Jersey Governor James Florio cut the ribbon. This moment marked the completion of a bypass around New York City that had been planned for decades. The portion of I-287 between the US 202 interchange in Oakland and the Route 208 interchange in Franklin Lakes overtook the westernmost portion of Route 208, truncating that route to its current location.

The completion of I-287 in New Jersey had significant effects on traffic and development patterns in the area. Several towns along the highway, such as Wanaque and Montville, saw increases in development. In addition, as the road was a bypass, it saw a significant increase in truck traffic wishing to bypass congested roads closer to New York City. The road also increased truck traffic on other north–south corridors, such as Route 31, from truckers wanting to bypass the New Jersey Turnpike by using these surface roads to get between the I-287 bypass of New York City and I-95 south to Pennsylvania. On July 16, 1999, Governor Christine Todd Whitman banned oversize trucks from using roads that are not part of the National Highway System, such as Route 31. Trucks were therefore forced to use I-287 and the New Jersey Turnpike to travel across the state. In the 1990s, high-occupancy vehicle lanes (HOV lanes) were built along I-287 between Bedminster and Parsippany. These HOV lanes, along with the ones that had been built on I-80, were opened to all traffic in 1998 due to lack of HOV usage, and the state did not have to repay the federal government the $240 million (equivalent to $ in ) to build the lanes. In 2011, a small section of the northbound side of the highway in Boonton collapsed into the Rockaway River due to Hurricane Irene. Near the end of that year, five people and a dog were killed when a small SOCATA TBM 700 airplane en route to Georgia crashed on the highway near exit 33 in Morris Township.

In August 2007, NJDOT started the I-287 (Middlesex Freeway) Rehabilitation Project to resurface the pavement between exit 5 in South Plainfield and I-95/New Jersey Turnpike in Edison Township, which is used by about 150,000 vehicles daily. Some of the bridges and overpasses had deteriorated to such a state that they needed to be replaced. On September 16, 2009, NJDOT announced the start of another rehabilitation and repaving project from exit 5 in Piscataway to the area of exit 10 in Franklin Township. This project, which was funded by the American Recovery and Reinvestment Act of 2009, cost $29 million (equivalent to $ in ) and was finished by April 2011.

New York State Thruway
The New York State Thruway portion of I-287 was planned around 1950 as part of a tolled limited-access highway that was to connect the major cities of New York. A bridge across the Hudson River was planned between Nyack and Tarrytown at a site that was close enough to New York City but far enough from the Port Authority of New York and New Jersey's jurisdiction area, as they opposed the crossing. The portion of the Thruway currently followed by I-287, including the Tappan Zee Bridge over the Hudson River, opened on December 15, 1955. In the 1960s, I-287 was designated along the New York State Thruway between Suffern and Tarrytown, while I-87 ran farther to the east on present-day I-684. On January 1, 1970, the I-87 designation was shifted onto this portion of the New York State Thruway to run concurrent with I-287.

The E-ZPass electronic toll collection system was first introduced on this segment of the Thruway at the Spring Valley and Tappan Zee Bridge toll plazas in 1993. The same year, an interchange in Suffern opened providing access to the newly opened New Jersey portion of I-287. In 1997, tolls for cars were eliminated at the Spring Valley toll plaza, with tolls remaining for trucks and other commercial vehicles. The I-87/I-287 interchange split near Tarrytown began a $187-million (equivalent to $ in ) reconstruction in 2001 in order to add additional lanes and rebuild overpasses and underpasses. Reconstruction in this area was completed in May 2004. In 2016, the Tappan Zee Bridge toll plaza was demolished and replaced with an electronic toll gantry on the west side. The Spring Valley toll plaza went all-electronic in 2018.

Cross-Westchester Expressway

Plans for a limited-access road to cross Westchester County east to west date back to the 1920s and became more needed after post-World War II traffic increases. When the Tappan Zee Bridge was proposed around 1950, the Cross-Westchester Expressway was becoming a more realistic idea. Construction of the freeway began in 1956, and was given the NY 119 designation. The design of the highway met Interstate Highway standards after opening and was supposed to have the I-187 designation. However, by the time the highway opened, it was officially designated as I-487 instead. At a cost of $50 million (equivalent to $ in ), the Cross Westchester Expressway was opened December 1960. Later in the 1960s, this segment of road was redesignated I-287 to make it a part of the beltway around New York City. I-287 was to continue past I-95 in Port Chester and was to cross Long Island Sound via the unbuilt Oyster Bay–Rye Bridge. On Long Island, the route would run along the Seaford–Oyster Bay Expressway (NY 135). Then, I-287 was again to be extended into Jones Beach by merging with the Wantagh State Parkway in Merrick. The plans for the bridge, and the I-287 extension onto Long Island, were dropped in 1973 by Governor Nelson Rockefeller as a result of community opposition and environmental concerns.

Ownership of the Cross-Westchester Expressway was transferred from the New York State Department of Transportation (NYSDOT) to the NYSTA in 1990 to help relieve the state's budget issues. On July 27, 1994, a propane truck crashed into an overpass on the Cross-Westchester Expressway in White Plains and exploded, killing the driver. The fire from the explosion spread into adjacent neighborhoods and injured 23 people. In the mid-1990s, a reversible HOV lane was proposed for the Cross-Westchester Expressway in order to alleviate congestion at a planned cost of $365 million (equivalent to $ in ). In addition, a Metro-North Railroad line and a guided busway were considered to serve the I-287 corridor in Westchester County as alternatives to the HOV lane. The proposed HOV lane was cancelled in 1997 by Governor George Pataki out of the fear it would have negative effects on the area in trying to solve traffic. Since 1999, the Cross-Westchester Expressway has been under construction in order to reduce congestion and improve safety for the motorists who use the highway. The final phase of the project, a reconstruction in the area of exit 8 in White Plains, was completed in December 2012, nine months ahead of schedule.

In late 2018, NYSDOT began installing ramp meters on entrance ramps to I-287 in Rockland and Westchester Counties. More are expected to be installed by 2020.

Tappan Zee Bridge replacement

The original Tappan Zee Bridge, carrying the concurrency of New York State Thruway, I-87, and I-287, was a cantilever bridge built during 1952–1955. Before its replacement in 2017, the deteriorating structure carried an average of 138,000 vehicles per day, substantially more traffic than its designed capacity. During its first decade, the bridge carried fewer than 40,000 vehicles per day. Part of the justification for replacing the bridge stems from its construction immediately following the Korean War on a low budget of only $81 million (equivalent to $ in ). Unlike other major bridges in the New York metropolitan area, the Tappan Zee was designed to last only 50 years. The Federal Highway Administration (FHWA) issued a report in October 2011 designating the Tappan Zee's replacement to be dual-span twin bridges. Construction officially began in October 2013, with the new spans being built to the north of the existing bridge. The new bridge connects to the existing highway approaches of I-87 and I-287 on both river banks. The northbound/westbound span opened on August 25, 2017. Southbound/eastbound traffic remained on the old bridge until October 6, 2017. At that point, southbound/eastbound traffic shifted to the westbound span of the new bridge and the old bridge closed. The bridge's eastbound span opened to traffic on September 11, 2018. Upon completion, the new Tappan Zee Bridge became one of the longest cable-stayed spans in the nation.

Future

In 2008, a private firm, Polimeni Associates, proposed to construct a more than  tunnel across Long Island Sound between Rye and Oyster Bay. It would start at the junction with the Cross Westchester Expressway and the New England Thruway in Rye and end at NY 135 and NY 25 in Syosset. Estimated to cost approximately $10 billion, it would feature three tubes: the outer tubes would have three lanes of vehicular traffic each and the inner tube would be used for maintenance. The proposed tunnel, which is to be operated by a private firm, is still awaiting approval to begin construction.

Exit list

See also

References

External links

Highway Heaven
Original configuration for I-87/I-287/NY 17 interchange in Suffern (Empire State Roads)

87-2
87-2
2
New York State Thruway Authority
87-2
287 Interstate
Transportation in Middlesex County, New Jersey
Transportation in Morris County, New Jersey
Transportation in Passaic County, New Jersey
Transportation in Somerset County, New Jersey
Transportation in Rockland County, New York
Transportation in Westchester County, New York
287